Dragoni is a comune in the Province of Caserta, Campania, Italy.

Dragoni may also refer to:

 Parco Dragoni in Forlì, a green area in the frazione Ronco of Forlì, Emilia-Romagna, Italy 
 Gabriella Battaini-Dragoni (born 1950), Italian author, educator and politician
 Giovanni Dragoni (1540–1598), Italian composer
 Maria Dragoni (born 1958), Italian operatic soprano

See also 
 Dragon (disambiguation)
 Dragone (disambiguation)